Pristava is a small settlement in the Municipality of Vojnik in eastern Slovenia. It lies in the valley of Ložnica Creek southeast of Vojnik. The area is part of the traditional region of Styria. It is now included in the Savinja Statistical Region.

References

External links
Pristava at Geopedia

Populated places in the Municipality of Vojnik